Syracuse Orange   

Mark Kerr (born December 21, 1968 in Toledo, Ohio) is an American champion collegiate wrestler and retired mixed martial artist. During his MMA career he was regarded by many as the best fighter in the world, and was a World Vale Tudo Championship tournament winner, a two-time UFC heavyweight tournament winner, and a PRIDE FC competitor. He is a two-time heavyweight ADCC champion, and won the absolute title once. 

In 2003, Kerr was the subject of an HBO documentary titled The Smashing Machine, which detailed his MMA career fighting in Vale Tudo, the UFC and PRIDE. The Smashing Machine also focused on Kerr's eventual struggle with substance abuse, his relationships with his then-girlfriend, various training partners, and his friendship with Mark Coleman.

Biography

Early life
Mark Kerr was born in Toledo, Ohio to Tom and Mary Kerr. His father was Irish, and his mother was Puerto Rican. From early childhood, he would dream of being in the World Wrestling Federation and would hold mock fights with his younger siblings in the back yard.

High school career
In 1983, Kerr began his wrestling career in Bettendorf, Iowa wrestling as a freshman at Bettendorf High School where he shared the wrestling room with another future MMA champion Pat Miletich who was a senior at the time. After his freshman year at Bettendorf, Kerr and his family moved to Toledo, Ohio where he became a high school state champion wrestling for Toledo Waite.

College career
At Syracuse University, Kerr was the Division I champion at 190 pounds in 1992. Randy Couture, wrestling for Oklahoma State University, took second place. Kerr was also a Division I All-American in 1992. In 1994, Kerr was the USA Senior Freestyle Champion at 220 pounds.

Mixed martial arts career 
While training as an amateur wrestler, Kerr became interested in mixed martial arts as a way to earn money. He, his long-time friend and training partner Mark Coleman and Tom Erikson were initially scouted by Richard Hamilton, who had managed Ultimate Fighting Championship fighter Don Frye until a falling out and was now offering a place in UFC 10 against him. However, nothing came from it, and Coleman ended up hunting down the chance. Eventually, Kerr and Hamilton arranged for the former to train with Coleman and fight at Brazilian event World Vale Tudo Championship 3 in January 1997. His appearance was highly anticipated, as other wrestlers like Coleman or Erikson were already known in the MMA community, though there were doubts about Kerr's true skills. Kerr himself was doubtful about it, to the point Hamilton had to force him to fight under the threat the Brazilian crowd might riot and kill him if he didn't show up.

World Vale Tudo Championship 
Kerr made his debut in MMA at WVC 3 against UFC veteran Paul Varelans. The bout lasted two minutes, with Kerr slamming Varelans with a takedown, mounting him and landing punches and knee strikes for the stoppage. The same happened to his next opponent, Mestre Hulk, a capoeira police teacher who had become known for besting Brazilian jiu-jitsu fighter Amaury Bitteti. After losing two teeth to Kerr's ground and pound, Hulk crawled out of the ring, getting disqualified. Kerr then reached the finals, where he was pitted against jiu-jitsu fighter Fabio Gurgel. Again, the fight would bring echoes, this time those of the bout between Erikson and Gurgel's teammate Murilo Bustamante, which happened the same year.

Kerr went to the fight with a broken hand from the Hulk fight, but he had 50 pounds over Gurgel. He took Gurgel down, passed his guard with ease and bloodied him with multiple kinds of strikes. The situation prolonged itself by 19 minutes, with the Brazilian trying armlocks and triangle chokes from the bottom, but Kerr avoided them and kept landing punishment. The fight had no time limit, but at the 30 minute mark, seeing that Gurgel was unable to defend anymore, the judges stopped the fight and gave Kerr the win.

Ultimate Fighting Championship 
Following his success in Brazil, Mark Kerr was invited to fight in the Ultimate Fighting Championship. Kerr had previously been told of the event by Coleman, who was himself a UFC tournament winner and champion by this point. Kerr's first bout in the UFC came at UFC 14 where he fought in the heavyweight tournament. His first fight was against krav maga representative Moti Horenstein, and Kerr defeated his opponent by technical knockout at 2:22 of the first round. With this win Kerr advanced to the finals of the tournament where he beat Dan Bobish with a submission (chin to the eye) at 1:38 of the first round; Kerr's win over Bobish earned him the UFC 14 Heavyweight tournament title.

Following his success at UFC 14, Kerr was invited to compete at the next UFC tournament — UFC 15. In this tournament, Kerr's first opponent was Greg Stott whom he defeated in 17 seconds from the opening of the fight, winning by way of knockout with a knee to his opponent's head. Advancing to the finals, Kerr fought Dwayne Cason and finished his opponent within the first minute of the opening round, winning the UFC 15 Heavyweight tournament.  Kerr's winning of the UFC 15 tournament was his last fight for the Ultimate Fighting Championship. Following his win of UFC 15, Kerr decided to fight in Japan for the Pride Fighting Championships due to the UFC's promotional difficulties and Pride's larger paychecks.

Pride Fighting Championships 
After considering an offer from Japanese promotion Shooto, Kerr signed up with Pride for a matchup against fellow UFC champion Royce Gracie at Pride 2 in 1998. The match, as per Gracie's demands, would have been without time limits or referee stoppages. However, Royce pulled out after the fight had been advertised. Kerr was then slated to fight Branco Cikatic. Kerr utilized the same ground-and-pound fighting style from his previous fights, taking his opponent onto the mat and then using strikes and submissions to try to finish the fight. Kerr was said to be an improved version of Mark Coleman because he was proficient in wrestling, submissions, and take downs, with good cardio and an ever-improving striking game under his tutelage with Bas Rutten. Around the time that Kerr entered PRIDE, many considered Kerr to be one of the top MMA Heavyweight fighters in the world.

Kerr won four bouts between Pride 2 and Pride 6. However, his status was soon questioned after his first bout with Igor Vovchanchyn at Pride 7, in which he was knocked out by illegal knee strikes. Even though the loss was overturned and changed to a "No Contest" ruling, Kerr admitted that the initial loss had been a difficult decision for him to face. Following his fight against Vovchanchyn, Kerr fought in the Pride Grand Prix 2000 Opening Round and won over Enson Inoue. His win against Inoue earned him a place at the Pride Grand Prix 2000 Finals, where he fought Kazuyuki Fujita and lost by decision. At Pride 10 - Return of the Warriors Kerr defeated Igor Borisov by submission. Four months later, at Pride 12 - Cold Fury, he lost by decision in the rematch with Vovchanchyn. Kerr then lost to Heath Herring at Pride 15 via TKO. With his second loss in a row, Kerr decided to take time away from MMA.

In 2004, Kerr returned to PRIDE, fighting Yoshisha Yamamoto at Pride 27. Just 40 seconds into the fight, Kerr attempted a double leg takedown, but accidentally spiked his head into the canvas, stunning him with Yamamoto quickly following up with punches to end the fight. With his third straight loss under the PRIDE FC banner, Kerr quit PRIDE.

Speaking of Kerr's time fighting in Japan, Mark Coleman said, "Every time a fight came around he was pretty scared. He was intimidated by the whole situation and that is probably what led to him using pain killers."

Later career 

After his loss to Yoshihisa Yamamoto, Kerr was supposed to make his comeback against Wes Sims in the American Championship Fighting (ACF) on May 6, 2006 at the Denver Coliseum, but was not medically cleared to fight due to a hand injury.

On February 11, 2007, Kerr fought Mustafa Al Turk at Cage Rage 20: 'Born 2 Fight'. Kerr lost his footing after an attempted roundhouse kick and he was mounted, stunned with a series of blows and submitted within the first round. Kerr was supposed to fight Sean O'Haire on August 17 in the Global Fighting Championships first show at the Mohegan Sun Arena but was cancelled due to his high blood pressure and his license was suspended indefinitely. 

Mark Kerr fought in the World Cage Fighting Organization (WCO) in November 2007, winning his bout against Steve Gavin by Americana after 1:39 of the first round.

Kerr competed in the ADCC Submission Wrestling World Championship (ADCC), a world class submission wrestling tournament. In 2000, Kerr won the ADCC Open Weight Absolute Tournament. Among the fighters he defeated at ADCC were Carlos "Carlão" Barreto, Sean Alvarez, Ricco Rodriguez, Mike Van Arsdale, Josh Barnett and Tony Netcler. It was quite notable at the time when Mark Kerr, Mario Sperry and Royler Gracie were dominating the ADCC each in their own weight classes.

Kerr is an avid powerlifter, reportedly able to bench press 425 lb (192.5 kg) and squat 550 lb (250 kg).

In 2008, Kerr launched a comeback. In March, Mark beat Chuck Huus by Submission (Keylock/Americana) at CCCF – Battle on the Border. In April, he lost to Oleg Taktarov in one round by kneebar. Two months later, Kerr was choked out in the opening round by deaf fighter Tracy Willis at a C-3 Fights show in Cocho, Oklahoma. On July 26, Ralph Kelly stopped Kerr in the first round at Xp3. On September 27, 2008 Kerr lost to fellow heavyweight Jeff Monson by rear-naked choke, in a battle of former ADCC champions.

On August 28, 2009, Kerr faced fellow wrestler Muhammed Lawal at an M-1 Global event. Kerr was taken down and subsequently pounded into unconsciousness in just 25 seconds, receiving several blows to the head after he was clearly unable to defend himself. This led the event's TV commentators to openly speculate that Kerr's fighting career was over. Guy Mezger, in the post-fight discussion, suggested that it was time for Kerr to "find another vocation". Kerr has only won four of his 15 fights since 2000 and has lost each of his last five fights.

As of 2010, Kerr considered himself "99.9 percent retired" and was pursuing a degree with an eye on pharmaceutical sales. As of 2015 he was working at a Toyota dealership.

HBO's The Smashing Machine 
In 2002, HBO aired a documentary titled The Smashing Machine, directed by John Hyams, which dealt with the life and career of Mark Kerr. The program chronicles Kerr's addiction to painkillers and the "no holds barred" aspect of early mixed martial arts competition. Kerr's then-girlfriend, Dawn Staples, and mixed-martial artists Bas Rutten, Kevin Randleman and Mark Coleman also appear in the film. Bas Rutten states clearly during the documentary that due to Kerr's ability to end fights quickly, the Pride tournament directors were removing all of Kerr's 'weapons' (notably head-butts and knees to the head of a grounded opponent) in an attempt to make the fights last longer for television and crowd satisfaction.

Championships and accomplishments

Collegiate wrestling 
NCAA Division I Collegiate Championships
1992 190 lbs 1st Place champion

Freestyle wrestling 
FILA World Championships Freestyle Results
1993 220 lbs 7th Place
USA Senior Freestyle Championships
1994 220 lbs 1st Place champion

Grappling credentials 
ADCC World Submission Wrestling Championships
ADCC 1999
99 kg+: 1st Place
ADCC 2000
99 kg+: 1st Place
Openweight: 1st Place
ADCC 2001 Superfight championship: Defeated Mario Sperry.
ADCC 2003 Superfight championship: Lost to Ricardo Arona.
ADCC Hall of Fame inductee

Mixed martial arts 
World Vale Tudo Championship
WVC 3 Heavyweight tournament winner
Ultimate Fighting Championship
UFC 14 Heavyweight Tournament Winner
UFC 15 Heavyweight Tournament Winner

Submission wrestling record 

|- style="background:#f0f0f0; text-align:left;"
| style="border-style:none none solid solid; "| Result
| style="border-style:none none solid solid; "| Opponent
| style="border-style:none none solid solid; "| Method
|-
| Win|| Sean Alvarez || Points
|-
| Win|| Chris Haseman || Points
|-
| Win|| Josh Barnett || Points
|-
| Win|| Carlos "Carlão" Barreto || Points
|-
| Win|| Sean Alvarez || Points
|-
| Win|| Ricardo Almeida || Points
|-
| Win|| Mike Van Arsdale || Points
|-
| Win|| Leo Vieira || Points
|-
| Win|| Ricco Rodriguez || Points
|-
| Win|| Rigan Machado || Points
|-
| Win|| Anthony Netzler || Submission
|-
| Win|| Josh Barnett || Submission (kimura)
|-
| Win|| Mario Sperry || Points
|-
| Loss|| Ricardo Arona || Points
|-

Mixed martial arts record

|-
| Loss
| align=center| 15–11 (1)
| Muhammed Lawal
| KO (punches)
| M-1 Global: Breakthrough
| 
| align=center| 1
| align=center| 0:25
| Kansas City, Kansas, United States
| 
|-
| Loss
| align=center| 15–10 (1)
| Jeff Monson
| Submission (rear-naked choke)
| Vengeance FC
| 
| align=center| 1
| align=center| 3:17
| Concord, North Carolina, United States
| 
|-
| Loss
| align=center| 15–9 (1)
| Ralph Kelly
| TKO (punches)
| Xp3: The Proving Ground
| 
| align=center| 1
| align=center| 4:11
| Houston, Texas, United States
| 
|-
| Loss
| align=center| 15–8 (1)
| Tracy Willis
| Submission (guillotine choke)
| C-3 Fights: Contenders
| 
| align=center| 1
| align=center| 0:45
| Concho, Oklahoma, United States
| 
|-
| Loss
| align=center| 15–7 (1)
| Oleg Taktarov
| Submission (kneebar)
| YAMMA Pit Fighting
| 
| align=center| 1
| align=center| 1:55
| Atlantic City, New Jersey, United States
| 
|-
| Win
| align=center| 15–6 (1)
| Chuck Huus
| Submission (americana)
| CCCF: Battle on the Border
| 
| align=center| 1
| align=center| 2:41
| Newkirk, Oklahoma, United States
| 
|-
| Win
| align=center| 14–6 (1)
| Steve Gavin
| Submission (kimura)
| WCO: Kerr Vs. Gavin
| 
| align=center| 1
| align=center| 1:39
| Hollywood, California, United States
| 
|-
| Loss
| align=center| 13–6 (1)
| Mostapha al-Turk
| TKO (submission to punches)
| Cage Rage 20
| 
| align=center| 1
| align=center| 2:29
| London, England
| 
|-
| Loss
| align=center| 13–5 (1)
| Mike Whitehead
| TKO (punches)
| IFL: World Championship Semifinals
| 
| align=center| 1
| align=center| 2:40
| Portland, Oregon, United States
| 
|-
| Loss
| align=center| 13–4 (1)
| Yoshihisa Yamamoto
| TKO (punches)
| Pride 27
| 
| align=center| 1
| align=center| 0:40
| Osaka, Osaka, Japan
| 
|-
| Loss
| align=center| 13–3 (1)
| Heath Herring
| TKO (knees)
| Pride 15
| 
| align=center| 2
| align=center| 4:56
| Saitama, Saitama, Japan
| 
|-
| Loss
| align=center| 13–2 (1)
| Igor Vovchanchyn
| Decision (unanimous)
| Pride 12 - Cold Fury
| 
| align=center| 3
| align=center| 5:00
| Saitama, Saitama, Japan
| 
|-
| Win
| align=center| 13–1 (1)
| Igor Borisov
| Submission (neck crank)
| Pride 10 - Return of the Warriors
| 
| align=center| 1
| align=center| 2:06
| Tokorozawa, Saitama, Japan
| 
|-
| Loss
| align=center| 12–1 (1)
| Kazuyuki Fujita
| Decision (unanimous)
| Pride Grand Prix 2000 Finals
| 
| align=center| 1
| align=center| 15:00
| Tokyo, Japan
| 
|-
| Win
| align=center| 12–0 (1)
| Enson Inoue
| Decision (majority)
| Pride Grand Prix 2000 Opening Round
| 
| align=center| 1
| align=center| 15:00
| Tokyo, Japan
| 
|-
| NC
| align=center| 11–0 (1)
| Igor Vovchanchyn
| NC (illegal knees)
| Pride 7
| 
| align=center| 2
| align=center| 4:36
| Yokohama, Kanagawa, Japan
| 
|-
| Win
| align=center| 11–0
| Nobuhiko Takada
| Submission (kimura)
| Pride 6
| 
| align=center| 1
| align=center| 3:04
| Yokohama, Kanagawa, Japan
| 
|-
| Win
| align=center| 10–0
| Hugo Duarte
| TKO (retirement)
| Pride 4
| 
| align=center| 3
| align=center| 2:32
| Tokyo, Japan
| 
|-
| Win
| align=center| 9–0
| Pedro Otavio
| Technical Submission (kimura)
| Pride 3
| 
| align=center| 1
| align=center| 2:13
| Tokyo, Japan
| 
|-
| Win
| align=center| 8–0
| Branko Cikatic
| DQ (grabbing the ropes)
| Pride 2
| 
| align=center| 1
| align=center| 2:14
| Yokohama, Kanagawa, Japan
| 
|-
| Win
| align=center| 7–0
| Dwayne Cason
| Submission (rear-naked choke)
| rowspan=2| UFC 15
| rowspan=2| 
| align=center| 1
| align=center| 0:53
| rowspan=2| Bay St. Louis, Mississippi, United States
| 
|-
| Win
| align=center| 6–0
| Greg Stott
| KO (knee)
| align=center| 1
| align=center| 0:17
| 
|-
| Win
| align=center| 5–0
| Dan Bobish
| Submission (chin to the eye)
| rowspan=2| UFC 14
| rowspan=2| 
| align=center| 1
| align=center| 1:38
| rowspan=2| Birmingham, Alabama, United States
| 
|-
| Win
| align=center| 4–0
| Moti Horenstein
| TKO (punches)
| align=center| 1
| align=center| 2:22
| 
|-
| Win
| align=center| 3–0
| Fabio Gurgel
| Decision (unanimous)
| rowspan=3| World Vale Tudo Championship 3
| rowspan=3| 
| align=center| 1
| align=center| 30:00
| rowspan=3| Brazil
| 
|-
| Win
| align=center| 2–0
| Mestre Hulk
| DQ (crawling out of the ring)
| align=center| 1
| align=center| 2:21
| 
|-
| Win
| align=center| 1–0
| Paul Varelans
| TKO (knees and punches)
| align=center| 1
| align=center| 2:06
|

References

External links

The Smashing Machine (2002) at IMDb

Mark Kerr (archive) at National Wrestling Hall of Fame

1968 births
Living people
Sportspeople from Toledo, Ohio
American male mixed martial artists
American practitioners of Brazilian jiu-jitsu
American sportspeople in doping cases
Doping cases in mixed martial arts
Mixed martial artists from Ohio
Heavyweight mixed martial artists
Mixed martial artists utilizing collegiate wrestling
Mixed martial artists utilizing Brazilian jiu-jitsu
American male sport wrestlers
Syracuse Orangemen wrestlers
Pan American Games medalists in wrestling
Pan American Games silver medalists for the United States
Wrestlers at the 1995 Pan American Games
Bettendorf High School alumni
Ultimate Fighting Championship male fighters
ADCC Hall of Fame inductees